His Majesty's Prison Lewes is a local category B prison located in Lewes in East Sussex, England. The term local means that the prison holds people on remand to the local courts, as well as sentenced prisoners. The prison is operated by His Majesty's Prison Service.

History
Lewes is a Victorian prison, built in 1853. The present day prison was constructed to replace the original Lewes Gaol which despite being enlarged in 1818 to hold 70 cells along with a treadmill had become too small. Built in 1791 Lewes Gaol was situated at the corner of North Street and Lancaster Street in Lewes. Lewes Gaol was sold to the Admiralty in 1853 to help house PoWs from the Crimean War and was finally demolished in 1963. 

An early prisoner at Lewes was George Witton, a Lieutenant in the Bushveldt Carbineers in the Boer War in South Africa. He was imprisoned after being implicated in the shooting murder of Boer prisoners. While imprisoned in the UK from 1902, George Ramsdale Witton wrote the book "Scapegoats of the Empire". After some time Winston Churchill, himself a former prisoner of the Boers during the war, put a number of parliamentary questions to the Colonial Secretary about Witton's ongoing incarceration. The campaign for Witton's release was successful and Witton was pardoned by King Edward VII and was freed on 10 August 1904. Witton then returns to Australia where he was welcomed as a hero by the then Prime Minister of Australia, Alfred Deakin. The 1980 film "Breaker Morant" depicts the story of the court-martial and conviction of Morant, Hancock, and Witton.

During the 1916 Easter Rising in Ireland, several prominent figures involved in it were held at Lewes Prison, including  Éamon de Valera  (1882–1975); Thomas Ashe (1885–1917); Frank Lawless (1871–1922); and Harry Boland (1887–1922).

A £1 million healthcare suite opened in the prison in June 2004, with facilities to treat physically ill prisoners and a 19-bed unit for assessing mental health.

In February 2008, an inspection report from Her Majesty's Chief Inspector of Prisons stated that one wing in Lewes Prison needed to be refurbished urgently after inspectors found that inmates had to eat their meals on toilets. The report also stated that anti-bullying and suicide prevention procedures at the prison were weak. However, inspectors found that vulnerable prisoners felt safe and that the prison was decent overall. Two months later a new accommodation block for 174 inmates was opened at the prison, with a commitment from prison management to refurbish older wings at Lewes within the following 12 months.

On 10 April 1852, Sarah Ann French was the last female to be hanged at the prison for her crime of murdering her husband William French.  The murder is known in East Sussex as the Onion Pie Murder.

Riots
In October 2003, after 25 to 30 prisoners were involved in a riot just before nightly lock-up that led to property damage and the injury of an officer, officials launched an inquiry.

In 2016 there was a riot lasting 6 hours when cells and offices were damaged, prison officers forced to retreat to safety.  Mike Rolfe of the Prison Officers Association blamed severe staff shortage and bad management.   Rolfe said, "There were only four staff on that wing and all four retreated to safety after threats of violence and the prisoners went on the rampage."  Two years previously a serving officer said Lewes Prison, "resembled a warzone" due to severe staff shortage and drug smuggling.

This is one of four serious incident within under two months, Riots also happened at Birmingham Prison, Bedford Prison. and Swaleside Prison.

The prison today
HMP Lewes is a category B local prison in the town of Lewes, East Sussex. Opened in 1853, the prison has the capacity to hold 742 male inmates.

A wing provides drug and alcohol support for 134 prisoners. B Wing is the Care & Separation Unit or CSU holding 16. C wing has 150 places for sentenced and unconvicted prisoners. F wing is a vulnerable prisoner unit and has 173 places for both unconvicted and convicted sex offenders and others requiring protection. G wing is the First Nights Centre and has units for 23. K wing is the Integrated Drug Treatment System (IDTS) unit for 22 prisoners. L wing and M wing have 80 and 94 places for sentenced prisoners respectively. The Health Care Centre has space for 9 prisoners.

Accommodation at the prison consists mainly of shared cells, with some single accommodation. A new house block; Sussex which accommodates L and M wings respectively was opened at the prison in April 2012.

The prison also has a First Night Centre for newly imprisoned / transferred inmates, and a Listener Scheme for those at risk of suicide and self-harm. The prison offers a range of full and part-time education including information technology, literacy, numeracy, and life/social skills, and has weekly library access for all. Additional employment is offered in the prison workshops.

An inspection of Lewes Prison in 2016 found it held 640 prisoners and was overcrowded.  HM Chief Inspector of Prisons reported over a quarter of prisoners at Lewes said they felt depressed or suicidal.  Not all staff had anti-ligature knives and some, "could not assure us that they would act appropriately in the event of a serious self-harm incident."

Lewes Prison has held offenders ranging from 570 through to 590 through the courts of Sussex. There was an increase of recall to prison of offenders from police stations across Sussex because of the COVID-19 pandemic. (?)

Notable inmates

 Thomas Ashe
 Harry Boland
 Éamon de Valera
 George Edalji
 Mick Jagger
 Reginald Kray
 Frank Lawless
 Khalid Masood the terrorist shot dead after leading the Westminster attack of 2017, spent time here after convictions of assault, GBH and possession of an offensive weapon 
 Tom O'Carroll, pro-paedophile activist and convicted sex offender
 George Witton, war criminal

References

External links
 Ministry of Justice pages on Lewes

Category B prisons in England
Prisons in East Sussex
1853 establishments in England
Men's prisons